Supplejack is a common name for several plants and may refer to:

 Plants in the family Flagellariaceae:
 Supplejack, Flagellaria indica a bamboo–like vine plant species native to eastern and northern Australia
 Plants in the family Rhamnaceae:
Paniculous supplejack, Berchemia racemosa, a climbing plant native to east Asia
Alabama supplejack, Berchemia scandens, a climbing plant native to central and southern parts of the United States
 Supplejack tree, Ventilago viminalis, a tree native to Northern and Central Australia
 Plants in the family Ripogonaceae:
 Supplejack, Ripogonum scandens,  a vine native to New Zealand

See also
Supplejack Downs, also Suplejack Downs, a pastoral lease in Australia